Ilex theezans, also I. theæzans and I. theazans, is a species of the genus Ilex in the family Aquifoliaceae, native to Brazil and typically found in its Atlantic Forest. It is sometimes used as an adulterant of maté and sometimes confused with the yerba maté (I. paraguarensis). In Brazil, it is sometimes called orelha-de-mico; but is more often simply known as congonha ("holly") or caúna (along with I. dumosa.

The species includes the subspecies I. theezans hieronymiana; the varieties I. theezans var. acrodonta, augusti, fertilis, gracilior, grandifolia, leptopylla, pachypylla, typica, and warmingiana; and the forms I. theezans f. glabra and puberula.

References

theezans
Endemic flora of Brazil
Flora of the Atlantic Forest
Taxa named by Carl Friedrich Philipp von Martius